Hoepstockbukta (English: Hoepstock Bay) is a small cove on the western coast of the Norwegian island of Jan Mayen and is named after Mathijs Jansz. Hoepstock, a Rotterdam whaler, who was the first to use the bay in 1616. The cove is shown on Joan Blaeu's 1662 map of the island.

References

 Norwegian Polar Institute Place Names of Svalbard Database

Bays of Jan Mayen
Whaling stations in Norway
Coves